William Thomas Stearn  (16 April 1911 – 9 May 2001) was a British botanist. Born in Cambridge in 1911, he was largely self-educated and developed an early interest in books and natural history. His initial work experience was at a Cambridge bookshop, but he also had a position as an assistant in the university botany department. At the age of 29 he married Eldwyth Ruth Alford, who later became his collaborator, and he died in London in 2001.

While at the bookshop, he was offered a position as a librarian at the Royal Horticultural Society in London (1933–1952). From there he moved to the Natural History Museum as a scientific officer in the botany department (1952–1976). After his retirement, he continued working there, writing, and serving on a number of professional bodies related to his work, including the Linnean Society, of which he became president. He also taught botany at Cambridge University as a visiting professor (1977–1983).

Stearn is known for his work in botanical taxonomy and botanical history, particularly classical botanical literature, botanical illustration and for his studies of the Swedish scientist Carl Linnaeus. His best known books are his Dictionary of Plant Names for Gardeners, a popular guide to the scientific names of plants, and his Botanical Latin for scientists.

Stearn received many honours for his work, at home and abroad, and was made a Commander of the Order of the British Empire (CBE) in 1997. Considered one of the most eminent British botanists of his time, he is remembered by an essay prize in his name from the Society for the History of Natural History, and a named cultivar of Epimedium, one of many genera he produced monographs on. He is the botanical authority for over 400 plants that he named and described.

Life

Childhood 
William Thomas Stearn was born at 37 Springfield Road, Chesterton, Cambridge, England, on 16 April 1911, the eldest of four sons, to Thomas Stearn (1871 or 1872–1922) and Ellen ("Nellie") Kiddy (1886–1986) of West Suffolk. His father worked as a coachman to a Cambridge doctor. Chesterton was then a village on the north bank of the River Cam, about two miles north of Cambridge's city centre, where Springfield Road ran parallel to Milton Road to the west. William Stearn's early education was at the nearby Milton Road Junior Council School (see image). Despite not having any family background in science (though he recalled that his grandfather was the university rat-catcher) he developed a keen interest in natural history and books at an early age. He spent his school holidays on his uncle's Suffolk farm, tending cows grazing by the roadside where he would observe the wild flowers of the hedgerows and fields. Stearn's father died suddenly in 1922 when Stearn was only eleven, leaving his working-class family in financial difficulties as his widow (Stearn's mother) had no pension.

That year, William Stearn succeeded in obtaining a scholarship to the local Cambridge High School for Boys on Hills Road, close to the Cambridge Botanic Garden, which he attended for eight years till he was 18. The school had an excellent reputation for biology education, and while he was there, he was encouraged by Mr Eastwood, a biology teacher who recognised his talents. The school also provided him with a thorough education in both Latin and Greek. He became secretary of the school's Natural History Society, won an essay prize from the Royal Society for the Protection of Birds and spent much of his time at the Botanic Garden. Stearn also gained horticultural experience by working as a gardener's boy during his school holidays, to supplement the family income.

Stearn attended evening lectures on paleobotany given by Albert Seward (chair of botany at Cambridge University 1906–1936), and Harry Godwin. Seward was impressed by the young Stearn, giving him access to the herbarium of the Botany School (now Department of Plant Sciences—see 1904 photograph) and allowing him to work there as a part-time research assistant. Later, Seward also gave Stearn access to the Cambridge University Library to pursue his research.

Later life
Stearn was largely self-educated and his widowed mother worked hard to support him while at school but could not afford a university education for him, there being no grants available then. When not at the Botany School, he attended evening classes to develop linguistic and bibliographic skills. His classes there included German and the classics. He obtained his first employment at the age of 18 in 1929, a time of high unemployment, to support himself and his family. He worked as an apprentice antiquarian bookseller and cataloguer in the second-hand section at Bowes & Bowes bookshop, 1 Trinity Street (now Cambridge University Press), between 1929 and 1933 where he was able to pursue his passion for bibliography. During his employment there, he spent much of his lunchtimes, evenings and weekends, at the Botany School and Botanic Garden. This was at a time when botany was thriving at Cambridge under the leadership of Seward and Humphrey Gilbert-Carter. 

On 3 August 1940, he married Eldwyth Ruth Alford (1910–2013), by whom he had a son and two daughters, and who collaborated with him in much of his work. Ruth Alford was a secondary school teacher from Tavistock, Devon, the daughter of Roger Rice Alford a Methodist preacher and mayor of Tavistock. When their engagement was announced in The Times, Stearn was vastly amused to see that he was described as a "Fellow of the Linen Society", a typographical error for Linnean Society. Stearn was brought up an Anglican, but was a conscientious objector and after the Second World War he became a Quaker. In his later years, following official retirement in 1976 he continued to live in Kew, Richmond. His entry in Who's Who lists his interests as "gardening and talking". He died on 9 May 2001 of pneumonia at Kingston Hospital, Kingston upon Thames, at the age of 90. His funeral took place on 18 May at Mortlake crematorium. He left three children (Roger Thomas Stearn, Margaret Ruth Stearn and Helen Elizabeth Stearn) and an estate of £461,240. His wife, whose 100th birthday was celebrated at the Linnean Society in 2010, lived to the age of 103.

Professor Stearn had a reputation for his encyclopedic knowledge, geniality, wit and generosity with his time and knowledge, being always willing to contribute to the work of others. He had a mischievous sense of fun and was famous for his anecdotes while lecturing, while his colleagues recalled that "he had a happy genius for friendship". He was described as having a striking figure, "a small man, his pink face topped with a thatch of white hair", and earned the nickname of "Wumpty" after his signature of "Wm. T. Stearn".

Career

Cambridge years (1929–1933) 
Stearn began his career as a gardener at Sidney Sussex College after leaving school at 13. He then became a bookseller at Bowes & Bowes. While working at the bookshop he made many friends among the Cambridge botanists and participated in their activities, including botanical excursions. In addition to Professor Seward, those influencing him included the morphologist Agnes Arber, Humphrey Gilbert-Carter the first scientific director of the Botanic Garden, John Gilmour then curator of the university herbarium and later director of the Garden (1951–1973), the horticulturalist E. A. Bowles (1865–1954), who became his patron, Harry Godwin, then a research fellow and later professor and Tom Tutin who was working with Seward at that time. Seward gave him full research facilities in the herbarium. He continued his research, visiting the Royal Botanical Gardens, Kew, in 1930, at the age of 19, and also spent two weeks at the herbarium of the Musée National d'Histoire Naturelle, Paris, with the aid of a £15 grant from the Royal Society to study Epimedium. Also in 1930, the Fifth International Botanical Congress was held at Cambridge, and Stearn was able to attend. During this time he commuted between the bookshop, the Botany School, Botanic Garden and home by bicycle, his preferred means of transportation throughout his life.

Lindley Library, Royal Horticultural Society (1933–1952) 
In 1933, H. R. Hutchinson, who was the Librarian at the Lindley Library, Royal Horticultural Society's (RHS) in London, was due to retire. John Gilmour, now assistant director at the Kew Gardens, put forward Stearn's name, together with Bowles, a vice-president of the Society, who had discovered Stearn at the bookshop. Stearn was 22 when he began work at the library, initially as assistant librarian, before taking over Hutchinson's position after six months. He later explained his appointment at such a young age as being the result of World War I: "All the people who should have had those jobs were dead." There he collaborated with Bowles on a number of plant monographs, such as Bowles' Handbook of Crocus and their work on Anemone japonica (Anemone hupehensis var. japonica). Written in 1947, it is still considered one of the most comprehensive accounts of the origins and nomenclature of fall-blooming anemones. Stearn was one of the last people to see Bowles alive, and when Bowles died, Stearn wrote an appreciation of him, and later contributed the entry on Bowles to the Oxford Dictionary of National Biography. Much of his spare time was spent studying at the Kew Gardens.

The Lindley Library, the largest horticultural library in the world and named after the British botanist John Lindley (1799–1865), was established in 1868 by the acquisition of Lindley's 1,300 volumes upon his death. It had recently undergone considerable change. In 1930, the library had been rehoused in a new floor added to the society's Vincent Square headquarters, but the role of the library was somewhat downgraded. Frederick Chittenden had been appointed as Keeper of the Library (1930–1939), and Hutchinson reported directly to him. Stearn related that when he reported for duty, Hutchinson was completely unaware of the appointment of his new assistant.

Lindley was one of Stearn's inspirations, also being a librarian who had a long association with the RHS. Lindley also bequeathed his herbarium to the Cambridge University Herbarium, where it now forms the Lindley Collection. As Stearn remarked "I came to know his numerous publications and to admire the industry, tenacity and ability with which he undertook successfully so many different things". Later Stearn would publish a major work on Lindley's life and work. Lindley's contributions to horticultural taxonomy were matched only by those of Stearn himself. Stearn soon set about using his antiquarian knowledge to reorganise the library, forming a pre-Linnean section. Not long after his arrival the library acquired one of its largest collections, the Reginald Cory Bequest (1934), which Stearn set about cataloguing on its arrival two years later, resulting in at least fifteen publications.

While at the library he continued his self-education through evening classes, learning Swedish, and travelling widely. Stearn used his three-week annual leaves in the pre-war years to visit other European botanical libraries, botanic gardens, museums, herbaria and collections, as well as collecting plants, with special emphasis on Epimedium and Allium. His travels took him to Switzerland, Italy, Germany, Austria, Czechoslovakia, Denmark, and Sweden.

War years (1941–1946) 
The only break from this employment was the war years 1941–1946, leaving his assistant Ms. Cardew as acting librarian. Initially Stearn served as an air raid warden, before enlisting. As a conscientious objector, he could not serve in a combatant role, but was accepted into the Royal Air Force (RAF) Medical Services, as he had previously worked with the St John Ambulance Brigade. He served in the RAF in both England, and Asia (India and Burma, where he worked in intelligence, and was awarded the Burma Star). While there he undertook studies of Indo-Malayan and Sikkim-Himalayan tropical vegetation, carried out botanical explorations, taught biology to troops and began work on his Botanical Latin. His wartime observations led to collaborative publications such as An enumeration of the flowering plants of Nepal (1978–1982), Beautiful Indian Trees (2nd ed. 1954), as well as works on Himalayan species of Allium. On returning from the war, Stearn and his new wife, Eldwyth Ruth Stearn, were obliged to live in the Lindley Library for a while till they found a more permanent home, due to the acute housing shortage in London.

Natural History Museum (1952–1976)
From the Lindley Library, Stearn (see 1950 Photograph) moved to the Botany Department at the Natural History Museum, South Kensington in 1952, and by the time he retired in 1976, he was the Senior Principal Scientific Officer there. He had now achieved his aim of becoming a research scientist, despite lack of formal qualifications, enabling him to spend more of his time collecting and studying plants. During this time the museum was undergoing steady expansion, with new staff and programmes. At the museum he was put in charge of Section 3 of the General Herbarium (the last third of the Dicotyledons in the Bentham & Hooker system, i.e., Monochlamydae) and floristic treatment of the regions of Europe, Jamaica, the United States, Australia and Nepal, including work on the museum's Flora of Jamaica and the Nepal flora he started work on during the war. Seven volumes of the Flora of Jamaica had appeared prior to the Second World War. Although the project was revived after the war, and Stearn carried out six months of field work in Jamaica, it never came to fruition; no further volumes appeared. In Jamaica, Stearn followed in the footsteps of Sir Hans Sloane (1660–1753), whose collection had been left to the Natural History Museum. Stearn's generic work at the museum concentrated on Allium, Lilium and Paeonia. He continued to travel widely, with field work in Europe (particularly Greece), Australia, and the United States, and published 200 papers during his twenty-four years at the museum, and although the library was not his responsibility, he spent much time there adding written notes to many of the critical texts.

While at the museum, Stearn became increasingly involved in the work of the Linnean Society during his Kensington years. He was also offered the George A. Miller professorship of botany at the University of Illinois (1966), but felt he would be unable to leave his commitments in London. At the time of his retirement in 1976, he was still using a fountain pen as his only means of communication and scholarship, a fact commemorated by his retirement present of a Mont Blanc pen capable of writing for long periods without refills.

Retirement (1976–2001)
Following his retirement on 30 November 1976 he continued to work, both at the museum and at the Royal Botanical Gardens, Kew, where his home at 17 High Park Road, Kew Gardens, Richmond (see image), gave him access to the herbarium and library, a short bicycle trip away. Indeed, 35 percent of his total publications appeared in the quarter century of his retirement. He was commissioned to write a history of the museum for its centenary (1981), although he did so with some difficulty, due to deadlines and budget constraints. The task, which took three years, was made more difficult for him by the museum's decision to censor his critical comments. He continued his association with the Lindley Library all his life, being an active committee member and regularly attended RHS flower shows even after he was barely able to walk.

Sojourn in Greece 

As a student of the classics he was passionate about Greece, its mountains and plants (such as Paeonia) and all things Greek, both ancient and modern. The Stearns had formed a friendship with Constantine Goulimis and Niki and Angelos Goulandris, founders of the Goulandris Museum of Natural History in Kifissia, Athens. Stearn first met the Goulandris' in 1967, and offered practical help with their museum. He also stayed with them when he and his wife visited Greece. Niki Goulandris illustrated both Wild Flowers of Greece that Goulimis and Stearn wrote in 1968, as well as his Peonies of Greece (1984). The latter work typified Stearn's encyclopedic approach, including topics such as mythology and herbalism in addition to taxonomy. Stearn then took on the editorship of Annales Musei Goulandris, the scientific journal of the museum (1976–1999), succeeding Werner Greuter, the first editor, having been instrumental in getting the journal launched in 1973. Eldwyth Ruth Stearn took on the job of compiling the indexes. When he retired from this position he was 88, and was succeeded by John Akeroyd. He was a liberal contributor to the journal, and during this time he and Eldwyth Ruth Stearn undertook their translation of The Greek Plant World in Myth, Art, and Literature (1993).

Societies and appointments
Stearn was a member of the Linnean Society for many years, becoming a fellow as early as 1934. He served as botanical curator 1959–1985, council member 1959–1963 and as vice-president 1961–1962 and president 1979–1982, producing a revised and updated history of the society in 1988. He also served as president of the Garden History Society and the Ray Society (1975–1977). The Royal Horticultural Society had made him an honorary fellow in 1946 and in 1986 he became a vice-president. Stearn became a member of the Botanical Society of Britain and Ireland (BSBI) in 1954, joining the Maps Committee the following year to prepare their Atlas of the British Flora (1962). He remained on that committee till 1968, when it became the Records Committee. For 40 years he was the BSBI referee for Allium. While at the Lindley Library, he became a founding member of the Society for the Bibliography of Natural History (later, the Society for the History of Natural History) in 1936, was one of its most active publishing members based on his cataloguing work at the library, and published a history of the society for their 50th anniversary in 1986. Other societies on which he served include the British Society for the History of Science (vice-president), the British Society for the History of Medicine (Council), the Garden History Society (president 1977–1982) and was a corresponding member of the Botanical Society of America.

Stearn was appointed Sandars Reader in Bibliography, University of Cambridge in 1965 and from 1977 to 1983 he was visiting professor at Cambridge University's Department of Botany, and also Visiting Professor in Botany at Reading University 1977–1983, and then Honorary Research Fellow (1983–). He was also a fellow of the Institute of Biology (1967) and was elected an Honorary Fellow of Sidney Sussex College, Cambridge in 1968.

Work
William Stearn was the author of nearly 500 publications, including his autobiography. These included monographs, partial floras, books on botanical illustration, scholarly editions of historical botanical texts, dictionaries, bibliographies and botanical histories.

Early years

During Stearn's initial four years in Cambridge (1929–1933), he published twenty-four papers, predominantly in the Gardeners' Chronicle and Gardening Illustrated and the Journal of Botany, his first in 1929. While working as a gardener's boy during school holidays he had observed a specimen of Campanula pusilla (Campanula cochleariifolia) with a distorted corolla. He then described and published the first appearance of the causative agent, the mould Peronospora corollaea, in Britain, using the facilities of the Botany library.

At the Botanic Garden he developed a special interest in Vinca, Epimedium, Hosta and Symphytum, all of which he published monographs on. A series of botanical publications followed, starting with a new species of Allium (A. farreri Stearn, 1930). Stearn repeatedly returned to the genus Allium, and was considered a world expert on it; many species bear his name. 1930 would also see his first bibliographic work, on the botanist Reginald Farrer, whom he named Allium farreri after, and also described Rosa farreri (1933) and other species named after Farrer. It was while he was compiling Farrer's works in 1930 that he came across the latter's work, The English Rock-Garden (1919) and its account of Barren-worts (Epimedium), and kindled a lifetime interest in the genus. From 1932, he produced a series of papers on this genus, studying it at Cambridge, Kew and Paris. It became one of the genera which he was best known, and many species of which now bear his name. Epimedium and the related woodland perennial Vancouveria (Berberidaceae) would be the subject of his first monograph (1938) and were genera to which he would return at the end of his life. At the time the taxonomy of this genus was very confused, and with the help of the Cambridge Herbarium he obtained specimens from all over Europe to produce a comprehensive monograph. The work was so thorough that it was mistakenly considered a doctoral thesis by other botanists. He also began a series of contributions to the catalogue of the Herbarium, together with Gilmour and Tutin.

Later work
After moving to London, Stearn produced a steady output of publications during his years at the Royal Horticultural Society's Lindley Library (1933–1952). These covered a wide range of topics from bibliography to plant nomenclature, taxonomy and garden plants, with a particular emphasis on Vinca, Epimedium and Lilium. Within two years of joining the library in 1933, he had produced his first major monograph, Lilies (1935), in collaboration with Drysdale Woodcock and John Coutts. This text, in an expanded and revised edition, as Woodcock and Stearn's Lilies of the World (1950) became a standard work on the Liliaceae sensu lato. While at the library he also continued his collaboration with his Cambridge colleagues, publishing catalogues of the Herbarium collections, including the Catalogue of the Collections of the Herbarium of the University Botany School, Cambridge (1935). The second task imposed on him at this time involved the RHS role in maintaining revision of the International Code of Botanical Nomenclature (see Botanical taxonomy).

After his return to London in 1946, at the end of the Second World War, a number of major publications ensued, including Lilies of the World in 1950. The RHS also imposed two major tasks on their librarian. In 1950, Frederick Chittenden, a previous director of RHS Wisley and Keeper of the Library, died leaving unfinished the four volume RHS Dictionary of Gardening that the society had commissioned from him before the war. The war had interrupted the work as many of the expected contributors were unavailable. Stearn, together with Patrick Synge, the RHS Publications Editor, undertook to complete the work, particularly volume IV (R–Z), a task he completed within six months, with 50 new articles. The finished work was published in 1951 and not only did he undertake the role of editing this large work but his contributions covered 50 genera, 600 species and complex identification keys such as Solidago and Viola. Since Stearn's entries in volume IV extended from Soldanella to Zygotritonia, he would jest that he was but "a peculiar authority on plants from 'So-' onwards". He issued a revised version in 1956 with Synge in which he added a further 86 articles. His recollection of this task was that he acquired "that occupational hazard of compilers of encyclopaedias", encyclopedic knowledge.

Many of Stearn's collaborative works used his bibliographic skills. While his genus monographs largely concentrated on Mediterranean flora, notably Epimedium, Allium and Paeonia, he was also the author of species articles both popular and technical as well as a number of classical treatises. In addition he produced floristic treatments of a number of regions such as Jamaica and Nepal. He also contributed to many national Florae as diverse as Bhutan and Greece, as well as major regional florae including the Flora Europaea and European Garden Flora.

While his output covered a wide range of topics, he is best known for his contributions to botanical history, taxonomy, botanical bibliography, and botanical illustration. Botanical Latin (four editions 1966–1992), is his best known work, having become a standard reference and described as both the bible of plant taxonomists and a philological masterwork. It was begun during the war years and the first edition was basically a guide to Latin for botanists with no or limited knowledge of the language, which he described as a "do-it-yourself Latin kit" for taxonomists. Later, the work evolved into an etymological dictionary, but then Stearn learned that such a work had already been published in the Netherlands before the war. He then continued to expand it with the assistance of his wife and son, systematically collecting botanical terms from botanical texts. It is said that only he could have written this work, which explains not just the derivation of plant names but also the philological principles involved in forming those names. The work is considered responsible for the continued survival of Latin as the lingua franca of botany. In addition to this seminal text, he frequently delighted in the illumination that the classics could add to understanding plants and plant lore, such as his Five Brethren of the Rose (1965).

His best known popular work is his Dictionary of Plant Names, which found its way into the libraries of most horticulturalists. One of the focuses of his work at the Natural History Museum was the flora of the Caribbean, where he carried out field work. Stearn continued to return to the Cambridge Botanic Garden, cared for his own garden and worked with the RHS to become an authority on horticulture as well as botany. William Stearn collaborated with his wife, Eldwyth Ruth Stearn, on a number of his most important works, including Botanical Latin and Dictionary of Plant Names and translating German botanical history into English. Just before his death he completed a revision of his original Epimedium monograph.

Botanical history

William Stearn wrote extensively on the history of botany and horticulture, from Ancient Greece to his own times. He collected together J. E. Raven's 1976 J. H. Gray Lectures, editing and annotating them as Plants and Plant Lore in Ancient Greece (1990). In 1993, he and Eldwyth Ruth Stearn translated and expanded Baumann's Die griechische Pflanzenwelt in Mythos, Kunst und Literatur (1986) as The Greek Plant World in Myth, Art, and Literature.

Stearn compiled a major work on the life of John Lindley and produced an edited version of the classic book on herbals by Agnes Arber, one of the influences of his Cambridge years, and whose obituary he would later write for The Times. He also wrote a number of histories of the organisations he worked with as well as a number of introductions and commentaries on classic botanical texts such as John Ray's Synopsis methodica stirpium Britannicarum (1691), together with historical introductions to reference books, including Desmond's Dictionary of British and Irish Botanists (1994).

In his Botanical Gardens and Botanical Literature in the Eighteenth Century (1961), Stearn provides some insight into his interpretation of botanical history: The progress of botany, as of other sciences, comes from the interaction of so many factors that undue emphasis on any one can give a very distorted impression of the whole, but certainly among the most important of these for any given period are the prevailing ideas and intellectual attitudes, the assumptions and stimuli of the time, for often upon them depends the extent to which a particular study attracts an unbroken succession of men of industry and originality intent on building a system of knowledge and communicating it successfully to others of like mind.

Linnaeus

Stearn's historical research is best known for his work on Carl Linnaeus (1707–1778), which he began while at the Natural History Museum, and which won him a number of awards at home and abroad. Between 1953 and 1994 he produced more than 20 works describing Linnaeus' life and work.

Of Stearn's writings on Linnaeus, the most well known is his edition of the 1753 Species plantarum, published in facsimile by the Ray Society in 1957, for which he wrote both a 176-page introduction and an appendix. Concerned that Linnaeus' methods were imperfectly understood by his contemporaries, Stearn wrote that his introduction "provided concisely all the information about his Linnaeus' life, herbaria, publications, methodology etc. which a botanical taxonomist needs to know". The Times stated that no other botanist possessed the historical knowledge and linguistic skills to write, what is considered one of the classic studies of the Swedish naturalist and a highpoint of 20th century botanical scholarship. Subsequently, Stearn became a recognised authority on Linnaeus. Later, he would produce a bicentenary guide to Linnaeus (1978) for the Linnean Society.

Although Stearn spent much of his life studying and writing about Linnaeus, he did not admire the man's character, describing him as mean—"a jealous egoist, with a driving ambition". When asked which botanists in history he did admire, he cited John Lindley, Carolus Clusius (1526–1609) and Olof Swartz (1760–1818).

Botanical taxonomy
Stearn made major contributions to plant taxonomy and its history. In 1950 the Seventh International Botanical Congress was held in Stockholm, and the RHS would have been represented by Chittenden, but he had been taken ill. Bowles then arranged for Stearn and Gilmour to represent the society in his stead. The congress appointed a special committee to consider nomenclatural issues related to cultivated plants, which became known as the Committee for the Nomenclature of Cultivated Plants (the "Stockholm Committee"), with Stearn as secretary (1950–1953). Stearn then proposed an International Code of Nomenclature for Cultivated Plants (the "Cultivated Code"), producing the first draft that day. The code was accepted in principle by the committee, conditional on its approval by a parallel committee of the International Horticultural Congress (the Horticultural Nomenclature Committee), which would next meet in London in 1952 (the "London Committee"). Later that year Stearn was also appointed secretary of the London Committee so that he now represented both organisations. The two committees then met jointly on 22–24 November 1951 at the RHS building in London to draft a final joint proposal that was published by Stearn as secretary of an editorial committee and adopted by the 13th International Horticultural Congress the following year.

The resulting code was formulated as a supplement to the existing International Code of Botanical Nomenclature. Stearn introduced two important concepts, the terms "cultivar" and "grex". Cultivar, a term first proposed by L. H. Bailey in 1923, refers to a distinctive genus or species variety raised or maintained in cultivation, such as Euphorbia dulcis "Chameleon". Grex (Latin for "flock" or "herd") refers to a group of hybrids of common parentage, such as Lilium Pink Perfection Group. These concepts contributed a similar clarity to the nomenclature of garden or agricultural plants that Linnaeus had brought to the naming of native plants two centuries earlier. Stearn continued to play an active part in the International Botanical Congresses over many years, where he was remembered for his rhetorical persuasion on nomenclatural matters. He was also a pioneer in the application of computer-aided technology to (numerical taxonomy), as in his work on Columnea (1969).

Botanical bibliography
Motivated by his interest in botanical history and taxonomy, Stearn devoted a considerable part of his output to botanical bibliography, including numerous papers and catalogues establishing the exact publication dates of books on natural history, particularly from the early nineteenth century, including William Herbert's work on Amaryllidaceae (1821, 1837) and complete bibliographies of botanists such as John Gilmour (1989). At the RHS library he transformed the minimalist card indexing by introducing British Museum rules and adding extensive bibliographic information. He quickly realised that one of the major deficits in contemporary taxonomic nomenclature was a lack of precise dates of all the names, and set about rectifying this over a fifteen-year period, resulting in 86 publications, which was a major step in stabilising nomenclature. The importance of this lay in the rules of botanical nomenclature, which gives botanical names priority based on dates of publication. He considered his most important contribution in this regard to be his elucidation of the dating of the early 19th century collection of studies of Canary Islands flora by Webb and Berthelot (1836–1850). Another important work from this period was on Ventenat's Jardin de la Malmaison (1803–1804), also published in the new Journal of the Society for the Bibliography of Natural History. In a number of instances his contributions to others' work went unacknowledged, particularly when he was younger, even though his introductions (often with the title "Revised and enlarged by W. T. Stearn") could be as lengthy as the texts they preceded. His contributions to botanical bibliography and in particular the correct interpretation of historical texts from Linnaeus to Arber are considered of central importance to the field of taxonomy.

Botanical illustration

Within a few years after Stearn returned from the war, his Art of Botanical Illustration (1950) was published, remaining the standard work on the subject to this day. There was, however, some bibliographic confusionCollins, the publisher, had planned a book on botanical art for its New Naturalist series, but mistakenly commissioned both Stearn and the art historian Wilfred Blunt independently to produce the work. After the error was discovered the two decided to collaborate; Blunt wrote the work while Stearn edited and revised it. When it was published, Blunt's name was on the title page, while Stearn was only acknowledged in the preface. The omission was not rectified till he prepared the second edition in 1994, although the preface reveals Stearn's extensive contribution.

His continuing interest in botanical illustration led him to produce work on both historical and contemporary artists, including the Florilegium of Captain Cook and Joseph Banks from their first voyage  to the Pacific on the Endeavour, the similar account of Ferdinand Bauer's later botanical expedition to Australia with Matthew Flinders on the Investigator (1801–1803), and the work of illustrator Franz Bauer (the brother of Ferdinand). Stearn's studies of Ferdinand Bauer's Flora Graeca (1806–1840) enabled him to combine his passion for Greece with that of illustration. Other illustrators of this period that he wrote about included William Hooker.

Awards
William Stearn received three honorary doctorates during his lifetime, from Leiden (D.Sc.1960), Cambridge (Sc.D.1967), and Uppsala (Fil.Dr.1972). He was the Masters Memorial Lecturer, Royal Horticultural Society in 1964. In 1976 the Linnean Society awarded him their Gold Medal for his contributions to Linnean scholarship and taxonomic botany. In 1985 he was the Wilkins Lecturer of the Royal Society, entitled Wilkins, John Ray, and Carl Linnaeus. In 1986 he received the Founder's Medal of the Society for the History of Natural History and in 1993 he received the Engler Gold Medal from the International Association for Plant Taxonomy. The Royal Horticultural Society awarded him both their Veitch Memorial Medal (1964) and Victoria Medal of Honour (VMH, 1965). In 2000 he received the Asa Gray Award, the highest honour of the American Society of Plant Taxonomists. Stearn was appointed a Commander of the Order of the British Empire (CBE) in the 1997 Birthday Honours for services to horticulture and botany.

He was well regarded in Sweden for his studies on Linnaeus, and possessed a good grasp of the language. In addition to his honorary doctorate from Uppsala, the Royal Swedish Academy of Sciences awarded him their Linnaeus Medal in 1972, he was granted the title of Commander of the Swedish Order of the Star of the North (Polar Star) in 1980 and admitted to membership of the Royal Swedish Academy of Sciences in 1983. Stearn was also elected to membership of the Swedish Linnaeus Society.

Legacy
Stearn is considered a preeminent British botanist, and was once likened to botanical scholars such as Robert Brown, Darwin, the Hookers (William and Joseph) and Frans Stafleu. He has been variously described as a Renaissance man, a polymath, "the modern Linnaeus", "the great Linnaean scholar of our day",  "one of the world's greatest botanists" and a giant among botanists and horticulturalists. On his death, The Times noted his encyclopedic grasp of his field, stating that he was "acknowledged as the greatest botanical authority of the twentieth century". One description that Stearn rejected, however, was "the complete naturalist"an allusion to the title of his biography of Linnaeus. His contribution to his field was far greater than his extensive bibliography suggests, since he was known for his input into many of his colleagues' work, leading Professor P. B. Tomlinson to observe "he left no tome unstearned". The Society for the History of Natural History of which he was a founding member has created the William T. Stearn Student Essay Prize in his honour.

Eponymy
Stearn is the botanical authority for over 400 taxa that bear his name, such as Allium chrysonemum Stearn. Many plants have been named (eponymy) after him, including the orchid nothogenus hybrid ×Stearnara J. M. H. Shaw. A number of species have been designated stearnii after William Stearn, including:
Allium stearnii Pastor & Valdés
Berberis stearnii Ahrendt
Epimedium stearnii Ogisu & Rix
Justicia stearnii V.A.W. Graham
Schefflera stearnii R.A.Howard & Proctor

In light of his work on Epimedium, a cultivar was named in his honour in 1988, Epimedium 'William Stearn'.

Selected publications
 see  and

See also
History of botany
Cambridge Botanic Garden

Notes

References

Bibliography

General books, articles and chapters

Books

 (see Valerie Finnis)

 (see Flora Europaea)

 (see front matter)

Historical sources
 (see Philosophia Botanica)
 also available here

Articles

Chapters 
, in 
, in 
, in 
, in

Articles about Stearn

Stearn bibliography

Works by Stearn cited

Articles

Books

Chapters
, in 
, in  vol. 2
, in  vol. 1
, in  vol. 3
, in 
, in  vol. 5
, in  vol. 3 (vol. 2: pp. 390, 410ff in 2nd. ed.)
, in 
, in  vol. 4 (vol. 2: pp. 444ff in 2nd. ed.)
, in

Collaborative and edited work

Books and articles

 (see Banks' Florilegium)

 (see Species plantarum)
 (see Genera plantarum)
 (see Mantissa plantarum)

Reviews: Review: Massachusetts Horticultural Society

 (see Ferdinand Bauer)

, in 

 (see William Hooker)

Chapters
 , in  vol. 2 (vol. 1: pp. 133–146 in 2nd. ed.)
 , in

Websites

Images

Bibliographic notes

Citations for bibliographic notes

External links

 

1911 births
2001 deaths
British botanists
Employees of the Natural History Museum, London
Presidents of the Linnean Society of London
Linnean Medallists
Veitch Memorial Medal recipients
Commanders of the Order of the British Empire
Members of the Royal Swedish Academy of Sciences
Victoria Medal of Honour recipients
Commanders of the Order of the Polar Star
People from Chesterton, Cambridge
People associated with the University of Cambridge
British taxonomists
Deaths from pneumonia in England